Orrin Porter Rockwell (June 28, 1813 or June 25, 1815 – June 9, 1878) was a figure of the Wild West period of American history. A lawman in the Utah Territory, he was nicknamed Old Port and The Destroying Angel of Mormondom.

Rockwell served as a bodyguard, and was a personal friend, of Latter Day Saint movement founder Joseph Smith. After Smith's death in 1844, Rockwell became a bodyguard of his successor, Brigham Young, and traveled with him and members of the Church of Jesus Christ of Latter-day Saints (LDS Church) to the Salt Lake Valley in the present-day U.S. state of Utah.

Biography

Early years
Rockwell was born in Belchertown, Hampshire County, Massachusetts, to Orin and Sarah Rockwell, who were neighbors of the Smith family. He was a descendant of Edmund Rice, an early immigrant to Massachusetts Bay Colony.

Rockwell was eight years younger than Smith. While Smith was publishing the Book of Mormon, Rockwell picked berries at night and hauled wood into town to help pay for the publishing.

In 1830, at 16-years old, Rockwell was baptized into Smith's Church of Christ in Fayette, New York. 
 Historically, the date of Rockwell's baptism is April 6, the day the church was organized, but original documents suggest a probable date of June 9. Rockwell was the youngest member of the first group to be baptized into the church.

On February 2, 1832, Rockwell married Luana Beebe in Jackson County, Missouri, and was endowed in the Nauvoo Temple on January 5, 1846.

Rockwell killed many men as a gunfighter, a religious enforcer, and Deputy United States Marshal. According to legend, Rockwell told a crowd listening to United States vice president Schuyler Colfax in 1869, "I never killed anyone who didn't need killing", a quote used by actor John Wayne in a movie decades later.

Boggs attempted assassination accusation

On the evening of May 6, 1842, Lilburn Boggs was shot by an unknown party who fired at him through a window as he read a newspaper in his study. He was badly wounded but survived. Boggs was the governor of Missouri who had signed the Executive Order 44 on October 27, 1838, known as the "Extermination Order" evicting Mormons from Missouri by violent and deadly means.

The Sangamo Journal published a letter by John C. Bennett, a recently excommunicated Mormon who, prior to the assassination, had served as mayor of Nauvoo, Major General of the Nauvoo Legion, and Chancellor of the University of Nauvoo.

Bennett implicated Rockwell in the assassination attempt, writing:
"In 1841, Joe Smith predicted or prophesied in a public congregation in Nauvoo, that Lilburn W Boggs, ex-Governor of Missouri, should die by violent hands within one year. From one or two months prior to the attempted assassination of Gov. Boggs, Mr. O. P. Rockwell left Nauvoo for parts unknown to the citizens at large. I was then on terms of close intimacy with Joe Smith, and asked him where Rockwell had gone? "Gone," said he, "GONE TO FULFILL PROPHECY!" Rockwell returned to Nauvoo the day before the report of the assassination reached there."

Smith and his supporters vehemently denied Bennett's account.

Rockwell was apprehended in St. Louis on March 6, 1843. In late May, Rockwell briefly escaped from the Independence jail where he was being held.

On September 30, 1843, it was reported:
 "Orin Porter Rockwell, the Mormon confined in our county jail some time since for the attempted assassination of ex-governor Boggs, was indicted by our last grand jury for escaping from the county jail some weeks since, and sent to Clay county for trial. Owing, however, to some informality in the proceedings, he was remanded to this county again for trial. There was not sufficient proof adduced against him to justify an indictment for shooting ex-Governor Boggs; and the grand jury, therefore, did not indict him for that offence."

Though never indicted for the attempted assassination, Rockwell was tried and convicted of jailbreak. Rockwell was released on December 13, 1843—ten months after his arrest.

Utah years
Following Smith's death, Rockwell followed Brigham Young and the LDS Church to the Salt Lake Valley. In 1849, Rockwell was appointed as deputy marshal of Great Salt Lake City, and remained a peace officer until his death. He was well known for his endurance, loyalty, and relentlessness.

Rockwell operated the Hot Springs Hotel and Brewery at the southern end of the Salt Lake Valley, in an area known as "Point of the Mountain".

Rockwell's fame as a "mountain man" attracted the explorer, Richard Francis Burton.  In 1860, on his trip across America to the west coast, Burton stopped to explore the Salt Lake City area. He stayed with Lysander Dayton in a village near the city, and Dayton invited Rockwell to dinner. Rockwell sent for a bottle of Valley Tan Whiskey, and he and Burton drank shot-for-shot into the night, with Rockwell outlining steps Burton should take for safety during his passage to Sacramento. Rockwell advised Burton to carry a loaded double-barreled shotgun, sleep in a "dark camp" (unlit, miles from where supper was cooked), to never trust appearances, and to avoid the main trail, where "White Indians" (so-called because they were white robbers disguised as Indians to avert blame) preyed on travelers.

Death
Rockwell died in Salt Lake City, Utah Territory, of natural causes on June 9, 1878. He was buried in the Salt Lake City Cemetery. At the time of his death, Rockwell had been a baptized Latter-day Saint longer than anyone living. His epitaph reads:

He was brave and loyal to his faith. True to the Prophet Joseph Smith. A promise made him by the prophet. Through obedience, it was fulfilled.

At Rockwell's funeral, apostle Joseph F. Smith, nephew of Joseph Smith and future church president, spoke the following about Rockwell:

They say he was a murderer; if he was, he was the friend of Joseph Smith and Brigham Young, and he was faithful to them, and to his covenants, and he has gone to Heaven and apostates can go to Hell ... Porter Rockwell was yesterday afternoon ushered into Heaven clothed with immortality and eternal life, and crowned with all glory which belongs to a departed saint. He has his little faults, but Porter's life on earth, taken altogether, was one worthy of example, and reflected honor upon the church. Through all his trials, he never once forgot his obligations to his brethren and his God.

However, not all reactions to Rockwell's death were positive. On June 11, 1878, the Salt Lake Tribune stated, "Porter Rockwell is another of the long list of Mormon criminals whose deeds of treachery and blood have reddened the soil of Utah, and who has paid no forfeit to offended law."

Legacy
Rockwell served as a loyal, personal bodyguard to both Smith and later to Young. Separating fact from legends, folklore, and myths concerning Rockwell is difficult for historians, in large part because Rockwell was only semi-literate and kept no personal diary.

Rockwell had the distinction of being the subject of a direct prophecy by Smith. After spending eight months in jail on charges of attempting to assassinate Boggs, Rockwell traveled to Nauvoo, appearing unannounced at a Christmas party at Smith's home. After his identity was confirmed, Smith was moved to say:

I prophesy, in the name of the Lord, you—Orrin Porter Rockwell—so long as ye shall remain loyal and true to thy faith, need fear no enemy. Cut not thy hair, and no bullet or blade can harm thee.

The promise echoes one given by an angel to the parents of the biblical Samson.

Rockwell, at one time, cut his hair. After hearing of a balding widow with typhoid fever, he offered his famous long hair to make a wig. The recipient of the hair was Agnes Coolbrith Smith Pickett, widow of Smith's brother, Don Carlos, and mother of Ina Coolbrith.

The Porter Rockwell Trail is a walking trail that spans Lehi, Draper, White City, and Sandy.

Cultural influence
Rockwell has also been portrayed on screen by John Carradine in the 1940 film Brigham Young, by James Coburn in the 1995 television film The Avenging Angel, and by Gyll Huff in the 1995 Trent Harris film Plan 10 from Outer Space. He was also the main character in the 1969 Death Valley Days episode called the "Son of Thunder" (1969). Rockwell is portrayed by Corbin Allred in a supporting role in the 2019 film Out of Liberty.

Rockwell was the primary subject of the independent 1994 Rockwell.

In 2010, a documentary called Stories from the Life of Porter Rockwell was created by Issimo Productions, which includes historical re-creations of events from the life of Rockwell, as well as interviews with scholars and historians, including John W. Rockwell, great-great-grandson of Rockwell.

Two statues of Rockwell exist: one near the old site of his Hot Springs Hotel and Brewery near the Utah State Penitentiary, the other in Lehi, Utah, off of Main Street behind the "Porter's Place" restaurant which exists to celebrate his memory. The restaurant has since moved to Eureka, Utah.

See also

 Bear River Massacre
 Alexander William Doniphan
 Hawken rifle
 Ironport (beverage)
 Liberty Jail
 List of bodyguards
 List of Old West gunfighters
 List of Old West lawmen
 Mormon folklore
 Perry, Utah
 Pioneer Village (Utah): Gun Collection
 This is the Place Monument
 Lauritz Smith
 Lot Smith
 Utah War

Notes

References

External links

"Did Orrin Porter Rockwell Shoot Lilburn Boggs, Governor of Missouri?", Mormonism Researched by Kerry A. Shirts

1813 births
1878 deaths
American leaders of the Church of Jesus Christ of Latter-day Saints
Bodyguards
Burials at Salt Lake City Cemetery
Converts to Mormonism
Danites
Gunslingers of the American Old West
Latter Day Saints from Illinois
Latter Day Saints from Missouri
Latter Day Saints from New York (state)
Latter Day Saints from Utah
Leaders in the Church of Christ (Latter Day Saints)
Mormon pioneers
People of the Utah War
Religious leaders from Massachusetts
United States Marshals